Bazlul Haque Haroon is a Bangladesh Awami League politician and the incumbent Member of Parliament from Jhalokati-1.

Early life
Haroon was born on 1 March 1954. He holds B.A. and M.A. degrees.

Career
Haroon was elected to Parliament in 2008 and re-elected on 5 January 2014 from Jhalokati-1 as a Bangladesh Awami League candidate. He is a director of Premier Bank Limited.

References

Awami League politicians
Living people
1954 births
9th Jatiya Sangsad members
10th Jatiya Sangsad members
11th Jatiya Sangsad members